Guiyang North railway station is a railway station on the Shanghai–Kunming high-speed railway, the Guiyang–Guangzhou high-speed railway and the Chongqing–Guiyang high-speed railway in Guiyang, Guizhou Province, People's Republic of China. It serves as a rail transport hub for Guiyang, provincial capital of Guizhou province. The station is served by Line 1 of the Guiyang Metro.

See also
Guiyang East railway station

References

External links

Railway stations in Guizhou
Buildings and structures in Guiyang